Roxanne Trunnell (born April 26, 1985) is an American Paralympic equestrian. She won a three medals at the 2020 Summer Paralympics including a gold medal at 2020 Summer Paralympics in the individual championship test grade I and individual freestyle test grade I events and a bronze medal in the team open event.

Trunnell was infected with the H1N1 virus which caused a stroke and confined her to a wheelchair

References

External links 
 
 
 
 

1985 births
Living people
American female equestrians
American dressage riders
Paralympic equestrians of the United States
Paralympic gold medalists for the United States
Paralympic medalists in equestrian
Equestrians at the 2016 Summer Paralympics
Equestrians at the 2020 Summer Paralympics
Medalists at the 2020 Summer Paralympics
People from Richland, Washington
21st-century American women
20th-century American women